is a passenger railway station located in the town of in Miki, Kagawa, Japan.  It is operated by the private transportation company Takamatsu-Kotohira Electric Railroad (Kotoden) and is designated station "N15".

Lines

Layout
The station consists of a single island platform with a level crossing. The station is unattended and there is no station building, but only a shelter on each platform.

Adjacent stations

History
It was renamed to its present name on March 1, 1951.

Surrounding area
 Shingyo-ji Temple
 Aoba Kindergarten

Passenger statistics

See also
 List of railway stations in Japan

References

External links

  

Railway stations in Japan opened in 1947
Railway stations in Kagawa Prefecture
Miki, Kagawa